Pseudoloessa bispinosa is a species of beetle in the family Cerambycidae, and the type species of its genus. It was described by Breuning in 1960. It is known from Borneo and Malaysia.

References

Gyaritini
Beetles described in 1960
Taxa named by Stephan von Breuning (entomologist)